José Francisco Peña Gómez is a Santo Domingo Metro station on Line 1. It was open on 22 January 2009 as part of the inaugural section of Line 1 between Mamá Tingó and Centro de los Héroes. The station is between Gregorio Luperón and Hermanas Mirabal.

This is an elevated station built above Avenida Hermanas Mirabal. It is named in honor of José Francisco Peña Gómez.

References

Santo Domingo Metro stations
2009 establishments in the Dominican Republic
Railway stations opened in 2009